The 2000 Conference USA men's soccer tournament was the sixth edition of the Conference USA Men's Soccer Tournament. The tournament decided the Conference USA champion and guaranteed representative into the 2000 NCAA Division I Men's Soccer Championship. The tournament was hosted by Saint Louis University and the games were played at Hermann Stadium.

Bracket

Awards
Most Valuable Midfielder:
Brad Davis, Saint Louis
Most Valuable Forward:
Nick Walls, Saint Louis
Most Valuable Defender:
Joe Hammes, Saint Louis
Most Valuable Goalkeeper:
David Clemente, UAB

References

External links
 

Conference USA Men's Soccer Tournament
Tournament
Conference USA Men's Soccer Tournament
Conference USA Men's Soccer Tournament